St. Andrews State Park is a  Florida State Park located three miles (5 km) east of Panama City Beach Florida, off U.S. 98. It is the headquarters of one of the state's five AmeriCorps Florida State Parks chapters.

Recreational activities
The park has such amenities as two-and-a-half miles of beaches, bicycling, birding, boat tours, boating, canoeing, two fishing piers, hiking, kayaking, picnicking areas, scuba diving, snorkeling, swimming, wildlife viewing and full camping facilities. During the summer, camping reservations are recommended for best availability. It also has a visitor center, an interpretive exhibit and concessions.

Gallery

External links
 St. Andrews State Park at Florida State Parks

Parks in Bay County, Florida
State parks of Florida
Beaches of Florida
Beaches of Bay County, Florida